The Ombilin River is a river in West Sumatra, Indonesia, about 900 km northwest of the capital Jakarta.

Hydrology 
The river flows from Lake Singkarak in West Sumatra eastward to the east coast of Sumatra. It is called Batang Kuantan (Kuantan River) in the Kuantan Singingi Regency and the downstream until the river mouth at the Strait of Malacca is called Batang Indragiri (Indragiri River).

Geography
The river flows in the central area of Sumatra with predominantly tropical rainforest climate (designated as Af in the Köppen–Geiger climate classification). The annual average temperature in the area is 22 °C. The warmest month is May, when the average temperature is around 24 °C, and the coldest is January, at 20 °C. The average annual rainfall is 3023 mm. The wettest month is November, with an average of 444 mm rainfall, and the driest is June, with 124 mm rainfall.

See also

List of rivers of Indonesia
List of rivers of Sumatra

References

Rivers of West Sumatra
Rivers of Indonesia